Frank Stewart (1923–1979) was an Australian politician and rugby league player.

Frank Stewart may also refer to: 

Frank Stewart (poet) (born 1946), American poet
Dutch Savage (Frank Stewart, 1935–2013), American wrestler
Frank Stewart (1920s pitcher) (1906–2001), American pitcher
Frank Stewart (1930s pitcher), American baseball player
Frank Stewart (Australian footballer) (1910–1986), Australian rules footballer
Frank Stewart (artist), African-American photographer
W. Frank Stewart, silver miner and Nevada state senator from 1876 to 1880
Frank Stewart, American entrepreneur, founder of Stewart's Restaurants

See also

Francis Stewart (disambiguation)
Frank H. Stewart House, Newton, Massachusetts
Frank Stuart (1844–1910), Australian politician
Stewart (name)